Mumbra-Kalwa Assembly constituency is one of the 288 Vidhan Sabha (Assembly) constituencies of Maharashtra state in Western India.

Members of Assembly

Election results

2009

2014

2019

References

Assembly constituencies of Thane district
Assembly constituencies of Maharashtra